The 2017 TCR Middle East Series season was the first season of the TCR Middle East Series. The championship started at Dubai Autodrome in Dubai on 12 January and ended at Bahrain International Circuit in Bahrain on 10 March.

Teams and drivers

Calendar and results
The 2017 schedule was announced on 15 November 2016, with three events held across the Middle East.

Championship standings

Drivers' championship

Teams' Championship

References

External links
 

Middle East Series
TCR
TCR